Adolfo González Jiménez (born 27 September 1962) is a Mexican archer. He competed at the 1984 Summer Olympics, the 1988 Summer Olympics and the 1996 Summer Olympics.

References

External links
 

1962 births
Living people
Mexican male archers
Olympic archers of Mexico
Archers at the 1984 Summer Olympics
Archers at the 1988 Summer Olympics
Archers at the 1996 Summer Olympics
Place of birth missing (living people)
Pan American Games medalists in archery
Pan American Games silver medalists for Mexico
Pan American Games bronze medalists for Mexico
Archers at the 1983 Pan American Games
Archers at the 1987 Pan American Games
Medalists at the 1983 Pan American Games
Medalists at the 1987 Pan American Games
20th-century Mexican people